Daya Ram Shakya (19 September 1923 – 4 December 2003) was an Indian politician. He was elected to the Lok Sabha, the lower house of the Parliament of India from the Farrukhabad constituency of Uttar Pradesh as a member of the Janata Party. Shakya died on 4 December 2003, at the age of 80.

References

External links
Official biographical sketch in Parliament of India website

1923 births
2003 deaths
Janata Party politicians
Lok Sabha members from Uttar Pradesh
India MPs 1977–1979
India MPs 1980–1984